Fist Fight is a 2018 action drama produced by TVB, starring Vincent Wong, Mat Yeung, Philip Ng, Kaman Kong, Rebecca Zhu and Tiffany Lau as the main cast.

The plot focused on three brothers who were separated due to events occurring during the 1997 financial crisis. After reuniting years later, they are trapped in a big conspiracy plot.

Plot
Cheung Fei Fan ( Vincent Wong ), Ha Tin Hang (Mat Yeung) and Ho Tit Nam (Philip Ng) were brothers who have been separated for many years. When the three were young, their lives changed because of the 1997 Asian financial crisis. Many years later, they reunited and slowly found out that there was a great conspiracy in the past caused by the Former financial crisis response team now known as the Knights Club as they tried to uncover the truth behind their parents' death that has been covered up as a suicide case.

Cast

Main Characters

Knights Club (騎士會)

Cheung family

Ho family

Ma family

Chan family

Other cast members

Music

References

TVB dramas
Hong Kong television series
2010s Hong Kong television series